This is a list of now defunct airlines from Mali.

See also
 List of airlines of Mali
 List of airports in Mali

References

Mali
Airlines
Airlines, defunct
Airlines